Wari Athletic Club is an Indian multi-sports club based in the city of Kolkata, West Bengal. Its football section competes in the First Division of Calcutta Football League. The club was established in 1898 as Wari Club in Dacca, East Bengal (present-day Bangladesh). Following the partition of India, Calcutta-based members of the club shifted a branch in the city, and it continues to participate in state tournaments conducted by the Indian Football Association.

History

Formation and journey in Dacca
When the Wellington Club was discontinued, a few of its sports-loving members in 1898 went on to form the Wari Club at Dacca and thus was established the oldest club in Dhaka. Zamindar Rai Bahadur Surendranath Roy played a key role in the formation of the club. The first success came in 1910 at Cooch Behar, when Wari defeated the British Kings' House club at a tournament. After gaining popularity, the club in 1930, found their playing field at Paltan ground in Dacca. They also had moderate success in the prestigious IFA Shield tournament until 1945.

From 1931, Wari also expanded to other sports like cricket, hockey, tennis, volleyball, table tennis and indoor games.

Later years after partition in Calcutta
Following the partition of India, while the main Wari club remained in Dacca, a branch of the club shifted its operations as Wari Athletic Club in Calcutta by 1949. The founders of the club, Bhupendra Mohan (Pakhi) Sen (played for East Bengal) in 1939), Tejes (Bagha) Shome and Dinesh Dutta were all members of the Dacca Wari Club before the Partition. Through the initiative of the AIFF official Pankaj Gupta, they were inducted into Calcutta Football League third division by 1949. By 1952, they got promoted to First Division and even reached the semi-finals of 1953 IFA Shield. The next year in 1954, Wari AC finished as runners up in the Calcutta Football League. The club achieved fame when they defeated East Bengal 1–0 in the CFL in 1978, which prevented the "red and gold brigade" from retaining the title it won seven times between 1970 and 1977. 1984 season was disastrous for the club as they finished in bottom of the league table consisting of twenty seven teams, and was relegated to third division. In 2003, Wari appointed legendary Iranian-Indian footballer Jamshid Nassiri as its technical director.

After getting promotion from the CFL First Division (third tier) in 2019, the club on 28 July 2022, unveiled their new jerseys and announced new sponsors Maco Chicken and Hotel Royal Bengal, ahead of the CFL Premier Division B kickoff. Wari got relegated to the third tier again in 2022 Premier B season with sixteen points in fourteen matches.

Other departments

Field hockey
Wari AC has its field hockey division, which is active since its foundation. Affiliated with the Bengal Hockey Association (BHA), the team previously competed in Beighton Cup, which is one of world's oldest field hockey tournaments.

Men's cricket
Wari AC has a men's cricket section. It is affiliated with the Cricket Association of Bengal (CAB), which is the governing body of cricket in West Bengal. Based at Tent Maidan, in Mayo Road of Kolkata, the club primarily participates in tournaments conducted by CAB, including First Division League, J.C. Mukherjee T-20 Trophy, A. N. Ghosh Memorial Trophy, CAB One Day League and P. Sen Trophy.

Club overview

Club tent
Wari AC's club tent is situated on Mayo road in West-Coast Paper Maidan in Kolkata Maidan area near Esplanade. In the morning on 1 April 2019, the club tent went up in flame after a fire broke out due to short circuit. Four fire engines rushed to the spot and brought the fire under control when damage was done. In April 2022, new club tent was unveiled after a three-year long restoration works.

Jersey
Wari AC is among the few clubs playing in CFL whose club name on their official jersey is written in Bengali, compared to most clubs whose name is usually written in English.

Notable players
The club is known for bringing up talents in Kolkata football. Players like Tushar Rakshit, Ashim Shome, Tapas Shome, Nimai Goswami, Santo Mitra began their playing career in Wari. Legendary goalkeeper Pradyut Barman started his playing career with the club in 1957. Bhabani Ray was one of the earliest known stars of the club who later went on to represent India at the 1970 Asian Games. Parimal Dey played for Wari from 1961 to 1963, when Bhaga Som was coach. Samaresh Chowdhury appeared from 1967 to 1969. Pritam Kotal, who represented India at the 2019 AFC Asian Cup, played for Wari until 2010.

Honours

League
 Calcutta Football League
Runners-up (1): 1954
CFL Third Division
Champions (1): 1949

Cup
Trades Cup
Runners-up (2): 2005, 2016

See also

 History of Indian football
 List of football clubs in India
 Football in Kolkata

References

Further reading

Dutta, P. L., Memoir of 'Father of Indian Football' Nagendraprasad Sarbadhikary (Calcutta: N. P. Sarbadhikary Memorial Committee, 1944) (hereafter Memoir)

Ghosh, Saurindra Kumar. Krira Samrat Nagendraprasad Sarbadhikary 1869–1940 (Calcutta: N. P. Sarbadhikary Memorial Committee, 1963) (hereafter Krira Samrat).
Roselli, John. Self Image of Effeteness: Physical Education and Nationalism in Nineteenth Century Bengal. Past & Present (journal). 86 (February 1980). p. 121–48.
Sinha, Mrinalini. Colonial Masculinity, The Manly Englishman and the Effeminate Bengali in the Late Nineteenth Century (Manchester: Manchester University Press, 1995).
Mason, Football on the Maidan, p. 144; Dimeo, Football and Politics in Bengal, p. 62.

From recreation to competition: Early history of Indian football . pp. 124–141. Published online: 6 Aug 2006. www.tandfonline.com. Retrieved 30 June 2021.

External links
 CFL clubs at IFA (archived 9 October 2022)

Association football clubs established in 1898
1898 establishments in India
Football clubs in Kolkata
Sports clubs in India
Multi-sport clubs in India